Lycosphingia is a genus of moths in the family Sphingidae containing only one species, Lycosphingia hamatus. It is known from forests from Liberia and Ghana to Angola, the Congo and Uganda.

The length of the forewings is 29–31 mm.

References

Smerinthini
Taxa named by Walter Rothschild
Moths of Africa
Monotypic moth genera
Taxa named by Karl Jordan